Choge is a surname of Kenyan origin that may refer to:

Augustine Kiprono Choge (born 1987), Kenyan long onwealth Games champion
Julius Kirwa Choge (born 1978), Kenyan marathon runner and 2010 winner of the Marathon Oasis de Montreal

See also
Kipchoge, related name meaning "son of Choge"

Kalenjin names